Italo Oxilia (1887–1971) was an Italian antifascist. He used his skills as a boat captain to help members of the Italian Resistance to flee the country and to transport Italian republican volunteers to the Spanish Civil War.

Biography
Italo Oxilia was born to Giovanni and Maria Malagamba on August 3, 1887 in Bergeggi. An expert captain, he secretly expatriated Filippo Turati, Sandro Pertini, Ferruccio Parri, and Carlo Rosselli to Calvi in Corsica on December 12, 1926, by carrying him over the border on a motorboat he brought from Savona. He was condemned to prison, in absentia.

In exile, he lived for a while in France and Belgium, where he was an office worker and joined the Giustizia e Libertà movement. The house and land in Quiliano that his father had left to him was confiscated. He returned to Italy to help with a second flight. In July 1929, he helped the confined politicians Carlo Rosselli, Emilio Lussu, and Francesco Fausto Nitti escape from the island Lipari with a small yacht.

Oxilia then worked with several merchants that ferried Italian republican volunteers to the Spanish Civil War. When he returned to Italy, he was arrested in 1940 but was released by Mussolini. During the Italian resistance, he guided the  Matteotti group (part of the Brigate Garibaldi) in Villapiana. Afterwards, he directed the journal Giustizia e Libertà, the journal of the Savoyard section of the Action Party, and served as a councilor to the Savoyard communist politician .

After the war and these assignments, however, he lived in poverty until his death due to a lung illness on June 16, 1971.

References

Bibliography
 
 
 

1887 births
1971 deaths
Italian sailors
Italian anti-fascists
Italian editors
Members of Giustizia e Libertà
Italian exiles